AkelPad is a small, expandable text editor for Microsoft Windows. 

AkelPad is distributed as free and open-source software, hosted on SourceForge where it has been downloaded more than 3 million times.

Unicode and codepages
AkelPad handles full Unicode files written in UTF-8, UTF-16 (LE or BE), and UTF-32 (LE or BE), and can auto-detect Unicode files with or without a BOM. BOMs (byte order marks) can also be omitted, if desired, from file writing.

Codepages installed on the user's system can be used for reading or writing files; text can also be re-coded into other codepages. AkelPad implements an auto-detection algorithm for the detection of some common codepages used (optional).

AkelPad can also detect non-text (i.e. binary) files and will issue a message. Binary files can, however, be loaded and edited (e.g. internal text) if desired.

Plugins
The program's architecture is structured to allow external plugins (DLLs) for the extension of AkelPad's capabilities. At present, 31 plugins are implemented and available on AkelPad's homepage. Some of the more noteworthy plugins are:
Coder - code folding support, autocomplete support, syntax highlighting and color themes.
ContextMenu - user can customize the main menu and some context menus.
ToolBar - implements one or more user-configurable toolbars.  ToolBar buttons can access external programs if desired.
Explorer - embeds Windows Explorer into a separate pane in the user interface.
Scripts - scripts can access more than 40 internal AkelPad routines (for example, Zen Coding) and can, of course, be user written.
Hotkeys - user can assign functions to specific keys or key combinations. Functions may be internal to AkelPad, external (i.e. run external applications) or plugin related.
SpecialChar - toggles (on/off) display of normally invisible special characters, i.e. space, tabs, newline, vertical tabulation, formfeeds and null characters.

See also
List of text editors
Comparison of text editors

References

External links
 Homepage
 AkelPad download page
 Plugin download page
 Files at Sourceforge
 AkelPad User Forums

Windows text editors
Free text editors
Free software programmed in C++
Notepad replacements
Software using the BSD license